Inishcottle (Gaeilge: Inis Coitil) is an uninhabited island in Clew Bay, County Mayo, Ireland.

Demographics

References

Islands of County Mayo